Fredrick Treves may refer to:

 Sir Frederick Treves, 1st Baronet (1853–1923), English surgeon
 Frederick Treves (actor) (1925–2012), English actor